The Rautakoura is a bluegrass band from Helsinki, Finland, that was founded in 2004.  Its members include Juho Häme (bass), Lauri Häme (banjo), Matti Mikkelä (mandolin and guitar) and Pekka Pyysalo (guitar).

Rautakoura attended Uuden Musiikin Kilpailu in 2013.

Discography
Rautakoura have released five albums: Kaikki Peliin (2005), Rautakoura (2006), Maailman ympäri (2007), Kadulta (2008), Neljä vuodenaikaa (2010). A sixth album is due Spring 2013. 

Kaikki Peliin
 Calvin Klein lumisateessa
 Rotsi auki
 Viimeinen sivu
 Kaksoisvirtain maa
 Pitkä päivä Apollovuorella
 Arvonnan aika
 Väliaika
 Tähdet valkokankaalla
 Työn iloa (Työmiehen avautuminen)
 Yhteiskunnan muuli
 Faaraon taika
 Kaikki peliin

Rautakoura
 Köydet irti
 Matkalla etelään
 Ruutitynnyri
 Mies yli laidan
 Aamuun asti
 Aallon pohjalla
 Hylätty majakka
 Jäämerelle
 Rahat tai henki!
 Uutiset uudestaan
 Paluu horisonttiin

Maailman ympäri
 Varaslähtö
 Kun pitää mennä
 Maailman ympäri
 Matkakuume
 Maapallon ulkopuolella
 Kevät
 Perjantai
 Lännen-Pekka
 Kukaan ei tullut vastaan
 Aurinko nousee idästä
 Tarinoita matkalta

Kadulta
 Kesän paras päivä
 Hummeri
 Seitsemän veljestä
 Savimäki
 Parola Iittala Toijala Viiala Lempäälä
 Rankkasade
 Viikonloppu
 Kantola
 Karkuri
 Kulmilla
 WBC
 Iltatuli

Neljä vuodenaikaa
 I
 II
 III
 IV

Tien päällä taas
 Aikamatkalla osa 1
 Aikamatkalla osa 2
 Sateeseen
 Tie vie
 Tien päällä taas
 Junamatkalla
 Muukalainen
 Vantaa
 Pois pois
 Vieras
 Ilmalaivalla
 Kesä

References

External links
 Rautakoura Official Website
 Levytalo International Record Store
 The Finnish Bluegrass Music Association/Suomen bluegrass-musiikin yhdistys (English) | (Finnish)

Finnish musical groups
Finnish bluegrass music groups